Patrick Jonker (born 25 May 1969) is a retired Australian road bicycle racer from Dutch and German ancestry. He was a professional rider from 1993 to 2004. Jonker represented Australia twice at the Summer Olympics, in 1992 and 1996. He was an Australian Institute of Sport scholarship holder. The highlights of his career include wins in the 1997 Route du Sud, the 1999 Grand Prix de Wallonie and ending his career with a high profile victory in the 2004 Tour Down Under. In 2012, he denied any involvement in doping practices at  during his stint in the team in the 2000 season following the Lance Armstrong doping affair. He stated that the seven titles in the Tour de France that Armstrong won should be voided since the doping tests were unreliable at that time in his opinion.

Major results

1993
 1st Stage 5 Milk Race
 3rd Overall Teleflex Tour
1994
 8th Overall Critérium du Dauphiné
4th Overall Route Du Sud. France 
6th Overall Midi Libre France 
4th National Dutch Road Championships 
1995
 2nd Overall Circuit de la Sarthe
 3rd Dutch Food Valley Classic
1996
 2nd Overall Volta a Catalunya
1st Stage 4 Super Bagneres 
 8th Olympics time trial
1997
 1st Overall Route du Sud
 2nd Overall Regio-Tour
1998
 1st  Dutch National Road Race Championships
 9th Overall Critérium du Dauphiné
1999
 1st Grand Prix de Wallonie
 2nd Overall Route du Sud
2001
 2nd Overall Tour du Limousin
 3rd GP Ouest-France
 4th Grand Prix d'Isbergues
 5th Overall Tour Méditerranéen
 7th Overall Tour Down Under
2002
 3rd Overall Tour Down Under
2003
 7th Overall Tour Down Under
2004 
 1st Overall Tour Down Under

Tour de France
1994 – DNF 17th stage
1996 – 12th
1997 – 62nd
1998 – 34th
1999 – 97th

References

External links
 
 Patrick Jonker's profile on Cycling Base

1969 births
Living people
Australian male cyclists
Dutch male cyclists
Cyclists from Amsterdam
Cyclists at the 1992 Summer Olympics
Cyclists at the 1996 Summer Olympics
Olympic cyclists of Australia
Dutch emigrants to Australia
Australian Institute of Sport cyclists
Dutch cycling time trial champions